Edraianthus pumilio, the silvery dwarf harebell, is a species of flowering plant in the family Campanulaceae, native to Dalmatia in southern Croatia. It is an herbaceous perennial growing to 2.5 cm (1 in), forming a cushion of hairy, silvery-green leaves and bearing solitary violet upturned bell-shaped flowers in summer. It requires extremely free-draining, preferably alkaline, soil, and is best grown in an alpine garden or rockery.

The Latin specific epithet pumilio means "small in stature".

It has gained the Royal Horticultural Society's Award of Garden Merit.

References

Campanuloideae
Flora of Croatia